De Haan or de Haan is a Dutch family name meaning "The Rooster" ("haan" is the cognate of English "hen", but in Dutch refers to the male of this species). In 2007 20,707 people had this name in the Netherlands alone, making it the 29th most common name in that country. Variant spellings are De Haen, DeHaan, and Den Haan. People with this name include:

De Haan
Annemiek de Haan (born 1981), Dutch rower
Calvin de Haan (born 1991), Canadian ice hockey player
Caroline Lea de Haan (1881–1932), Dutch novelist writing as Carry van Bruggen, sister of Jacob israël de Haan
Chantal Nijkerken-de Haan (born 1973), Dutch politician
Cornelis de Haan (<1750–1793), Dutch Mennonite teacher and minister
Erik de Haan (born 1964), Dutch footballer
Eveline de Haan (born 1976), Dutch hockey player
Ferry de Haan (1972), Dutch footballer
Foppe de Haan (born 1943), Dutch football manager
Jacob de Haan (composer) (born 1959), Dutch composer
Jacob Israël de Haan (1881–1924), Dutch Jewish writer and journalist assassinated by the Haganah in Palestine, brother of Caroline
Jan de Haan (born 1951), Dutch composer, conductor and musician
Jo de Haan (1936–2006), Dutch cyclist
Laurens de Haan (born 1937), Dutch economist known for the Pickands–Balkema–de Haan theorem
Lex de Haan (1954-2006), Dutch computer scientist
Mattheus de Haan (1663–1729), Dutch Governor-General of the Dutch East Indies 
Meijer de Haan (1852–1895), Dutch painter
Poul de Haan (born 1947), Dutch coxswain
Radjin de Haan (born 1969), Dutch-Surinamese footballer
Roger De Haan, British businessman and philanthropist
Setske de Haan (1889–1948), Dutch writer of children's books with the pseudonym Cissy van Marxveldt
Sidney De Haan (1919–2002), English businessman
Wilhem de Haan (1801–1855), Dutch zoologist and paleontologist
 (1849–1930), Dutch conductor and composer

Bierens de Haan
David Bierens de Haan (1822–1895), Dutch mathematician and historian of science
Johannes Abraham Bierens de Haan (1883–1958), Dutch biologist and ethologist

Eilerts de Haan
Johannes Gijsbert Willem Jacobus Eilerts de Haan (1865–1910), Dutch explorer and soldier

De Haen
Abraham de Haen (1707–1748), Dutch draughtsman and engraver 
Anton de Haen (1704-1776), Austrian physician
David de Haen (1585–1622), Dutch painter and draughtsman
Eugen de Haën (1835–1911), German chemist

DeHaan
 Allyssa DeHaan (born 1988), American basketball and volleyball player
 Christel DeHaan (born 1942), German-born American businesswoman and philanthropist
 Dane DeHaan (born 1986), American actor
 Kory DeHaan (born 1976), American baseball outfielder
 M. R. DeHaan (1891–1965), American Bible teacher

Den Haan
Ada den Haan (born 1941), Dutch swimmer
 (1630–1676), Dutch admiral
Wouter den Haan (born 1962), Dutch economist

See also
De Haan (disambiguation)
Haan (surname)

References

Dutch-language surnames
Surnames from nicknames